Hong Kong Football Association Chairman's Cup 2006-07 was the 32nd staging of the competition, held between 5 March and 21 May 2007, and won by Citizen Reserve. The reserve teams of the 9 First Division League clubs entered the competition.

Despite the fact that the competition is for reserve teams, many teams send first team players for the matches. In fact, some of the clubs do not have any reserve team players, so many first team players, including foreign players, play in the matches as well.

Bracket

Note #: HKFC Reserve beat Wofoo Tai Po Reserve by 3–2 in the first round match to enter into the quarter-final.

First round

Quarter-finals

Semifinals

Final

Top Scorers

Trivia
 The final, which was scheduled on 20 May was postponed to 21 May due to heavy rain on the day.

References

2006-07
2007 domestic association football cups
2006–07 in Hong Kong football